Oswald Zappelli (27 October 1913 – 3 April 1968) was a Swiss fencer. He won a silver medal in the individual épée event at the 1948 Summer Olympics and bronze medals in the individual and team épée events at the 1952 Summer Olympics.

References

External links
 

1913 births
1968 deaths
Swiss male épée fencers
Olympic fencers of Switzerland
Fencers at the 1948 Summer Olympics
Fencers at the 1952 Summer Olympics
Olympic silver medalists for Switzerland
Olympic bronze medalists for Switzerland
Olympic medalists in fencing
Sportspeople from Lausanne
Medalists at the 1948 Summer Olympics
Medalists at the 1952 Summer Olympics
20th-century Swiss people